Chichakluy-e Hajji Aqa (also Romanized as Chīchaklūy-e Ḩājjī Āqā; also known as Chīchaklū-ye Ḩājjīāqā and Chīchaklū-ye Ḩājjī Āqā) is a village in Nazluy-ye Jonubi Rural District, in the Central District of Urmia County, West Azerbaijan Province, Iran. At the 2006 census, its population was 160, in 39 families.

References 

Populated places in Urmia County